The Guri–Amsa Bridge crosses the Han River in South Korea and connects the city of Guri and Gangdong-gu (district) in Seoul. As of 2017, it is the newest bridge that crosses the Han River.

Construction on the bridge began in September 2006, and there was controversy regarding the naming of the bridge. The Seoul City Naming Committee suggested "Amsa Bridge" in reference to Amsa-dong located in Gangdong, while the city of Guri suggested "Guri Bridge." Eventually, the Naming Committee compromised by naming the bridge "Guri–Amsa Bridge."

The bridge was partially opened on November 20, 2014, and opened in its entirety, including all entrances and exits, on June 29, 2015.

References

Buildings and structures in Guri
Buildings and structures in Seoul
Bridges in Gyeonggi Province
Bridges completed in 2015